The following is a list of individuals associated with State University of New York at Purchase through attending as a student, or serving as a member of the faculty or staff.


Notable alumni

Conservatory of Theater Arts and Film alumni
The alumni of the Conservatory of Theater Arts and Film, compose what has been called the "Purchase Mafia" by several different sources, including Edie Falco and Hal Hartley. The term was first coined by casting director, Eve Brandstein, and later used in multiple biographical listings of Purchase alumni on the Internet Movie Database. It was later picked up by the press when actress and Purchase alumna, Edie Falco, came to national attention as a result of her role on HBO's mob drama, The Sopranos.

Actors and actresses
Notable alumni and former students from the Conservatory of Theater Arts & Film include:

Kirk Acevedo
Rochelle Aytes
Robert John Burke
Parker Posey
Orlagh Cassidy
Ron Eldard
Susie Essman
Dwight Ewell
Edie Falco
Brian Gaskill
Terry Serpico
Rochelle Aytes
Seth Gilliam
Malcolm Goodwin
Josh Hartnett
Dean Haspiel
Kali Hawk
David Herman
Zoe Kravitz
Melissa Leo
Jodi Long
Matt Malloy
Michael C. Maronna
James McDaniel
Tracy Middendorf
Janel Moloney
Mizuo Peck
Adina Porter
Jason Ralph
Ving Rhames
Bill Sage

Paul Schulze
Wesley Snipes
Sherry Stringfield
Francie Swift
Richard Tanne
Stanley Tucci
Steven Weber
Shea Whigham
Will Scheffer
Jay O. Sanders
Lawrence Saint-Victor
Amanda Seales
Kellee Stewart
Mel Rodriguez
Laurence Mason
Meghan Andrews
Rey Valentin
Keegan DeWitt
Andy Bean
Constance Wu

Theatrical designers and technicians
David Gallo
Kenneth Posner
Brian MacDevitt

Playwrights and screenwriters
Carl Capotorto
Deborah Zoe Laufer
Donald Margulies
Jeffrey Alan Schechter

Producers
Tom Donahue
Bob Gosse
Paul Heyman
James Spione

Screenwriters
Hal Hartley
Jeffrey Alan Schechter
A. Dean Bell

Directors

Austin Chick
Abel Ferrara
Azazel Jacobs
Ilya Chaiken
Nick Gomez
Bob Gosse
Todd Graff
Hal Hartley
Danny Leiner
Tim McCann
Eric Mendelsohn
E. Elias Merhige

Jeffrey Alan Schechter
Rob Schmidt
James Spione
Alex Turner
Chris Wedge of Blue Sky Studios
John G. Young
Michael Spiller
A. Dean Bell
Nicholas McCarthy
Jeffrey Schwarz

Editors
Iris Cahn
Jeff Kushner
James Spione
Tom Cross

Dancers and choreographers

Doug Varone – José Limón Company, Doug Varone and Dancers, Lar Lubovitch Dance Company
Tami Stronach
Terese Capucilli - Martha Graham Dance Company
Kyle Abraham - Abraham.In.Motion

Musicians

Adult Mom
The Age of Rockets
Victor Axelrod
Chris Ballew of The Presidents of the United States of America
Mal Blum
Bill Charlap
Bryndon Cook
Imani Coppola
Crying (band) 
Dan Deacon
Despot
The Dude of Life
Elite
Fire Flies
Gabriel Garzón-Montano
Gregory and the Hawk
Edward W. Hardy
Kiss Kiss (band)
Langhorne Slim
Jeffrey Lewis
J-Zone
Mase
Meneguar (band)
Mirk
Mitski
Moby (majored in sociology)
Moving Mountains (band)
O'Death
Only Son (formerly of Moldy Peaches)
Jae Matthews of Boy Harsher

Jenny Owen Youngs
Daryl Palumbo of Glassjaw
LVL UP
Porches
Mary Ruth Ray
Suzzy Roche
Bess Rogers
Joel Rubin
Alan Shulman
Gerard Smith (musician) late bassist of TV on the Radio
Regina Spektor
Twin Sister
Sheer Mag
Vérité
Wooden Wand and the Vanishing Voice
Ice Spice
Samara Joy

Artists
Gregory Crewdson
Dan Friedman
Jon Kessler
Aaron Krach
Alan Resnick
Jimmy Joe Roche
Ron Rocco
Stephen Vitiello
Laura Vaccaro Seeger
Fred Wilson
Thomas E. Franklin

Liberal arts and sciences

Journalists
 Adam Nagourney
 J. Buzz Von Ornsteiner - forensic psychologist, journalist and television ;personality
 Michael Powell - New York Times

Activists 
 David Graeber
 Robyn Ochs
 Nasreen Pervin Huq

Scientists
Carl Safina
Jill Bargonetti

Authors
 Nora Raleigh Baskin
 Billy Taylor

Radio personalities
 Chris "Pepper Hicks" Stanley

Notable faculty 

 Shirley Neilsen Blum, a professor emeritus (1970–1989), she founded the Art History Department.

References

Purchase, State University of New York, List of people